Robert Raynier Rosado Berry (born 15 July 1995) is a Dominican professional footballer who plays as a midfielder for Atlético Pantoja and the Dominican Republic national team.

International career
Rosado made his formal debut for Dominican Republic on 22 March 2018, starting in a 4–0 friendly win against Turks and Caicos Islands. He had played two friendly matches in November 2017 against Nicaragua, but they were not recognised by FIFA.

References

1995 births
Living people
Dominican Republic footballers
Dominican Republic international footballers
Association football midfielders
Atlético Pantoja players
Liga Dominicana de Fútbol players
People from Hermanas Mirabal Province